The 1953 Tennessee Volunteers (variously Tennessee, UT, or the Vols) represented the University of Tennessee in the 1953 college football season. Playing as a member of the Southeastern Conference (SEC), the team was led by head coach Harvey Robinson, in his first year, and played their home games at Shields–Watkins Field in Knoxville, Tennessee. They finished the season with a record of six wins, four losses and one tie (6–4–1 overall, 3–2–1 in the SEC).

Schedule

Team players drafted into the NFL

References

Tennessee
Tennessee Volunteers football seasons
Tennessee Volunteers football